Netrikkan is a 1981 Indian Tamil-language drama film directed by S. P. Muthuraman and produced by Kavithalayaa Productions. The film stars Rajinikanth in a double role as father and son with Saritha and Menaka, while Goundamani, Lakshmi and Sarath Babu play supporting roles. The soundtrack and score were composed by Ilayaraja while the lyrics for the tracks were written by Kannadasan. The film's story and dialogues were written by Visu and the screenplay was written by K. Balachander. Babu and R. Vittal handled cinematography and editing respectively.

In the movie, the son wants his father to repent for the latter's mistake even if he respects his father very much. The film revolves around Chakravarthy, a middle-aged businessman who is a womanizer. In the process, he rapes a girl Radha. The rest of the film revolves around Chakravarthy's son and Radha teaching a lesson to his father to mend his ways. The film was released on 15 August 1981 became successful at the box office. The film received critical acclaim with Rajinikanth's performance as a middle-aged womanizer being widely praised. The movie title “Netrikkan" is believed to be inspired by the popular conversation between Sangam age poet Nakkeerar and Lord Shiva in Thiruvilayadal movie. The poet questions Lord Shiva, who is in the disguise of another poet, about the quality of the poem written by the Lord himself. Angered by Nakeerar's question, the Lord reveals himself by opening His Third eye. Still, poet Nakkerar is fearless, replying, “Netrikkan thirappinum kuttram kuttrame” which means, A mistake is a mistake even if you are God (One who has the Third Eye).The film was later remade in Telugu as Ahankari with Rajasekhar and was unofficially remade in Hindi as Rangeela Raja starring Govinda.

Plot 
The story revolves around Chakravarthy (Older Rajini) who is a successful textile businessman in Coimbatore. He is a big womanizer (perhaps his only weakness) and picks up any woman he wants.  Other characters being wife Meenakshi (Lakshmi), his son Santosh (also Rajini), and his daughter Sangeetha (Vijayashanthi). It doesn't take long for Santosh to find his father's provocative behavior and tries to mend his father's ways. Radha (Saritha) gets introduced as a candidate for the PRO (Public Relations Officer) interview and eventually gets selected and is sent to Hong Kong for training. Chakravarthy unable to tolerate his son's growing menace sets off to Hong Kong for a holiday. Here he meets Radha and at one point ends up raping her. Chakravarthy flies back to India where he is met with a number of changes which all point out to the new General Manager. This person turns out to be Radha who has joined with Santosh to teach Chakravarthy a lesson for life. How the duo succeeds in changing Chakravarthy's behavior forms the crux of the story.

Cast 

Rajinikanth as Chakravarthy/Santhosh (dual roles — father and son)
Lakshmi as Meenakshi (Chakravarthy's wife)
Saritha as Radha (the girl who is raped by Chakravarthy)
Menaka as Menaka (Santhosh's girlfriend)
Vijayashanti as Sangeetha (Chakravarthy's daughter/Santhosh's sister)
Goundamani as Singaram (Chakravarthy's driver)
Sarath Babu as Yuvaraja (Guest appearance)
Thengai Srinivasan (Guest appearance)
Neelu as Doctor

Production 
Netrikann is the inaugural production of K. Balachander's Kavithalayaa Productions. It had Rajini playing the roles of father and son. Unlike other films where the father's character is portrayed as a positive person and the son is a bit of a wastrel, in this film it is the father who is lecherous and the son is the good guy. Balachander produced the film as he felt that the concept had a lot of scope for Rajini to perform. Muthuraman was initially hesitant to direct the film but Balachander encouraged him to direct. Cameraman Babu introduced the mask shots through this film, the film had 90 mask shots.

Soundtrack 
The soundtrack was composed by Ilaiyaraaja

Reception 
Indiaglitz wrote that the film: "trumpeted Rajini is one of the finest wholesome actors of Tamil cinema".

Legacy 
A dialogue spoken by Rajinikanth, "Nee Upadesam pannina kai katti nikkara antha eshwaran illa da, naan Koteeshwaran" (I'm not Lord Shiva to pay obeisance to his son Murugan for teaching him lessons, I am a millionaire, got that?) attained popularity. Another upcoming film called Netrikkann is based on the title of this film.  The new film is being produced by Vignesh Shivan and the lead role being performed by Nayanthara.

References

External links 
 

Films directed by S. P. Muthuraman
1981 films
Films scored by Ilaiyaraaja
1980s Tamil-language films
Films about adultery in India
Films with screenplays by K. Balachander
Tamil films remade in other languages